Vrâncioaia is a commune located in Vrancea County, Romania. It is composed of six villages: Bodești, Muncei, Poiana, Ploștina, Spinești, and Vrâncioaia.

References

Communes in Vrancea County
Localities in Western Moldavia